Vasilios Dedidis (born 10 January 2000) is a professional footballer who plays as a forward for Carl Zeiss Jena.

Club career
After coming through the club's academy, on 14 June 2020, Dedidis made his professional 3. Liga debut for Carl Zeiss Jena as a substitute in a 0–0 draw with Uerdingen.

International career
Dedidis has represented Greece at under-17 and under-19 level.

References

External links

2000 births
Living people
Greek footballers
FC Carl Zeiss Jena players
Association football forwards
3. Liga players
Greece youth international footballers
Regionalliga players
Oberliga (football) players
Sportspeople from Weimar